Macrostomus palliatus is a species of dance flies, in the fly family Empididae.

References

Macrostomus
Insects described in 1902
Diptera of North America